Marko Lepik (born 9 April 1977) is a retired association football midfielder from Estonia. He played for several clubs in his native country, including Hiiu Kalur and JK Piraaja Tallinn.

International career
Lepik earned his first official cap for the Estonia national football team on 29 March 1995, when Estonia played Slovenia in Maribor. He obtained a total number of three caps.

References

1977 births
Living people
Estonian footballers
Estonia international footballers
Association football midfielders
FC Hiiu Kalur Kärdla players